The American President is a 1995 American romantic comedy-drama film directed and produced by Rob Reiner and written by Aaron Sorkin. The film stars Michael Douglas as President Andrew Shepherd, a widower who pursues a relationship with environmental lobbyist Sydney Ellen Wade (Annette Bening) – who has just moved to Washington, D.C. – while at the same time attempting to win the passage of a crime control bill during a re-election year. Martin Sheen, Michael J. Fox and Richard Dreyfuss star in supporting roles.

The American President grossed $107.9 million on a budget of $62 million, and was praised by critics for its performances (especially of Douglas and Bening), musical score, story, and screenplay. Composer Marc Shaiman was nominated for the Academy Award for Best Original Musical or Comedy Score for The American President. The film was nominated for Golden Globes for Best Director, Best Screenplay, Best Actor in a Comedy/Musical for Michael Douglas, Best Actress in a Comedy/Musical for Annette Bening, and Best Comedy/Musical. The American Film Institute ranked The American President No. 75 on its list of America's Greatest Love Stories.

Plot 
Popular Democratic President Andrew Shepherd prepares to run for re-election. The president and his staff, led by Chief of Staff and best friend AJ MacInerney, attempt to consolidate the administration's 63% approval rating by passing a moderate crime control bill. However, support for the bill in both parties is tepid: conservatives reject it, and liberals think it is too weak. If passed, however, Shepherd's re-election is presumed to be guaranteed. Shepherd resolves to announce the bill, and have the Congressional support to pass it, by his State of the Union Address.

When the unmarried President's cousin, Judith, is sick and unable to act as hostess at a state dinner for the French president, Shepherd realizes his staff's public portrayal of him as lonely widower is true. Soon after, Shepherd meets and is attracted to Sydney Ellen Wade, a lawyer employed by an environmental lobbying firm that is working to pass legislation to substantially reduce carbon dioxide emissions. During a meeting, Shepherd strikes a deal with Wade: if she can secure 24 votes for the environmental bill before his State of the Union Address, he will deliver the last 10 votes. MacInerney believes Wade will fail to obtain enough votes, thus releasing Shepherd from responsibility if the bill fails to pass.

Shepherd and Wade begin seeing each other and fall in love. Presidential hopeful Senator Bob Rumson steps up his attacks, focusing on Wade's activist past and maligning Shepherd's ethics and family values. The President's refusal to refute Rumson's aspersions lowers his approval ratings and erodes crucial political support that threatens the crime bill.

Wade is dejected after her failed meeting with three Michigan congressmen to discuss the environmental bill. When she tells Shepherd about the meeting, she inadvertently mentions that the congressmen want to defeat both the President's crime bill and Wade's environmental bill. Shepherd and A.J. are conflicted about how they obtained this sensitive information, but are unable to ignore the opportunity to pass the crime bill, even if it means the president going back on his deal with Wade.

Eventually, Wade secures enough votes for the environmental bill while Shepherd is three short. He can only obtain them by shelving the environmental bill to solidify the three Michigan congressmen's votes for the crime bill  which he agrees to do. Wade's firm fires her for failing to achieve their objectives and for seemingly jeopardizing her political reputation. She goes to see Shepherd to end their relationship and says she has a job opportunity in Hartford, Connecticut. While he defends the crime bill as his top priority, she criticizes it as weakly worded with little chance of preventing crime.

Prior to the State of the Union Address, Shepherd makes a surprise appearance in the White House press room and rebukes Rumson's attacks on his values and character, as well as his relentless innuendos that Wade prostituted herself for political favors. He declares he will send the controversial environmental bill to Congress with a massive 20% cut in fossil fuelsfar more than the 10% originally proposed. Furthermore, he is withdrawing the crime bill for a stronger one with significant gun control measures. His passion galvanizes the press and his staff. Shepherd and Wade reconcile, then she walks him to the doors of the House chamber where he enters to thunderous applause as he is about to deliver the State of the Union Address.

Cast

Production 
Originally, actor Robert Redford approached a number of screenwriters with the single-line premise, "the president elopes". Sorkin, on the basis of his treatment, was selected by Redford to write the screenplay with Redford attached to star. Emma Thompson turned down the role of Sydney Wade. When Reiner was brought aboard to direct, Redford dropped out. At the time, in October 1994, with cameras set to roll on November 30 of that year, Redford's publicist attributed his decision to his desire "to do a love story, but (Reiner) wanted to do something that was ultimately about politics".  Other sources suggested that Redford and Reiner "didn't get along,...It was a personality thing."

In later interviews, writer Aaron Sorkin told TV Guide he wrote the screenplay while high on crack cocaine while he was living at the Four Seasons Hotel in Los Angeles, which is why it took him three years to complete it.

An extensive White House set, of both the East and West Wings, was built on the Castle Rock Entertainment lot in Culver City. The set's Oval Office was later reused for the films Nixon and Independence Day.

Lawsuit 
William Richert sued the Writers Guild of America over not being credited on the screenplay of the film. Richert claimed Sorkin's screenplay was a thinly veiled plagiarism of Richert's 1981 screenplay The President Elopes. After Guild arbitration, Sorkin was awarded full credit on The American President. Richert also claimed that the television series The West Wing was derived from part of the same screenplay.

Release
The American President grossed $60.1 million in the United States, and $47.8 million in other territories, for a worldwide total of $107.9 million.

The film grossed $10 million in its opening weekend (finishing third), $9.7 million in its second weekend, and $5.3 million in its third (finishing sixth both times).

Reception
On Rotten Tomatoes, the film has an approval rating of 91% based on 55 reviews, with an average rating of 7/10. The site's critical consensus reads: "A charming romantic comedy with political bite, Rob Reiner's The American President features strong lead performances and some poignant observations of politics and media in the 1990s." On Metacritic, the film has a weighted average score of 67 out of 100, based on 21 critics, indicating "generally favorable reviews". Audiences polled by CinemaScore gave the film an average grade of "A" on an A+ to F scale.

It received praise and "Two Thumbs Up" from Siskel and Ebert who were surprised by how good the film was considering Rob Reiner's previous film, North, was both of their selections for the worst movie of the year. Ebert said after detesting North he was very happy and pleased to give Reiner's next film a unanimously positive review. Siskel praised Douglas and Bening for their performances.

Legacy

Influence on The West Wing 
The screenplay for the film inspired many aspects of Sorkin's later television drama The West Wing. The two productions follow the staff of a largely idealized White House, and like many of Sorkin's projects, share ideologies.

The film's influence can be seen most clearly in early episodes of the series; some dialogue in the two are nearly identical. Sorkin has been known to say that much of the first season was actually taken from material he edited out of the first draft of The American President script.

One of the issues touched on in the film and developed in the series relates to gun control bills, developed in "Five Votes Down". While the bill is ultimately withdrawn by President Shepherd because it is ineffectual, on the series President Bartlet and his staff work hard to pass their bill even though it is badly flawed (and end up doubly unhappy when VP John Hoynes, whom the President and senior staff are feuding with, clinches the bill for them by persuading an influential southern Democrat to support it).

More significant is the issue of a "proportional response" to military attacks on American assets abroad. In The American President, Andrew Shepherd finds himself in the Situation Room having to order such an attack against Libya's intelligence headquarters after they bombed a missile defense system called "C-STAD" (Capricorn Surface-to-Air Defense) which had been positioned by the U.S. in Israel. He muses for a single line "Someday, someone's gonna have to explain to me the virtue of a proportional response", before giving the order. In "A Proportional Response", President Bartlet finds himself in similar circumstances (Syrian intelligence shot down a U.S. plane in Jordan and killed numerous Americans, including a young Naval officer who the President had decided would be his personal physician) and, seated in the White House Situation Room with his own National Security Council asks: "What is the virtue of a proportional response?" In both cases, the President chooses a military response that is relatively measured, but in the movie President Shepherd never considers a "disproportionate" response while President Bartlet plans such an action to destroy a large civilian airport in Syria; he eventually gives the green light for a strike similar to the one used in the movie.

The Global Defense Council, the fictional environmental lobby where Sydney Wade worked, is also featured in the West Wing episode called "The Drop-In", and is often referred to in other episodes.

In The American President, Sydney Ellen Wade is ultimately fired from her lobbyist position because the president has brokered a deal that causes her legislative effort to fail. Similarly, in the final episode of the third season of The West Wing, Deputy Chief of Staff Josh Lyman uses the same tactic and ends up getting Amy Gardner fired from her position at the Women's Leadership Conference. Josh and Amy are dating when this takes place, just as the main characters are here. However, on the TV series it is Amy who tries to scuttle a bill (welfare reform) and Josh refuses to accept the demands of three Republican Congressmen because they amount to blackmail.

The American President includes mention of a Governor Stackhouse, while there is a Minnesota senator Howard Stackhouse (George Coe) in the two West Wing episodes "The Stackhouse Filibuster" and "The Red Mass". In the same way, the French President attending a state dinner in The American President seems to be the same President d'Astier that is often referred to in the West Wing.

Several actors from The American President reappear in The West Wing, including Martin Sheen (whose character in The American President, A.J., is at one point accused by Shepherd of lacking the courage to run for office himself) as President Josiah Bartlet, Anna Deavere Smith as National Security Advisor Dr. Nancy McNally, Joshua Malina as White House Communications Director Will Bailey, Nina Siemaszko as Ellie Bartlet, Ron Canada as Under Secretary of State Theodore Barrow, and Thom Barry as Congressman Mark Richardson.

Portrayals of the president as idealistic but indecisive are also similar. In The American President, Shepherd has to be convinced by his staff to stand up to his Republican opponent and pursue gun control and environmental legislation decisively. In The West Wing, Bartlet is sometimes referred to as “Uncle Fluffy” when endorsing moderate views that are more conciliatory and less resolute (for example, in the episodes “Let Bartlet Be Bartlet” and “The Two Bartlets”). More generally, both presidents are former university professors (history in the movie, economics in the show) with no military experience and a low tolerance for political expediency.

Other legacy 
The concept for the television show Spin City was set in motion after the writers had seen Michael J. Fox in The American President playing one of the President's political aides. They wanted him to play a similar character for television.

In January 2012, while criticizing then-leader of the opposition Tony Abbott in a speech at the National Press Club in Canberra, Australian Federal Minister Anthony Albanese plagiarised several lines from The American President.

In April 2013, New York Times columnist Maureen Dowd drew a sharp contrast between President Obama's unsuccessful effort to secure passage of expanded background-check legislation in the Senate, on one hand, and the all-out vote-gathering effort in The American President. The President responded to the column at the 2013 White House Correspondents' Dinner, noting the criticism and posing a series of rhetorical questions to Michael Douglas, who he said was in the audience, including, "Could it be that you were an actor in an Aaron Sorkin liberal fantasy?"

In the 2016 Presidential election candidate Ted Cruz paraphrased a portion of The American President when fellow candidate Donald Trump insulted Cruz's wife. Cruz stated, "...and if Donald wants to get into a character fight, he’s better off sticking with me because Heidi is way out of his league,” referencing the speech President Shepherd made about Rumson's attacks on Sydney Ellen Wade.

The film is recognized by the American Film Institute as #75 in its 2002 list of 100 Years...100 Passions.

References

External links 

 
 
 
 
 White House Museum – How accurately does the movie portray the actual White House? (Review)

1995 films
1990s English-language films
1990s political comedy-drama films
1990s romantic comedy-drama films
American political comedy-drama films
American romantic comedy-drama films
Films scored by Marc Shaiman
Films about elections
Films about fictional presidents of the United States
Films about widowhood in the United States
Films directed by Rob Reiner
Films set in the White House
Films set in Washington, D.C.
Films shot in Washington, D.C.
Films with screenplays by Aaron Sorkin
Castle Rock Entertainment films
Universal Pictures films
Columbia Pictures films
1990s American films